The 2008 Bandy World Championship for men was played at the Olympic Stadium in Moscow, Russia on 27 January–3 February 2008. Russia became champions.

Group stage

Group A

Group B

Final four
The top four teams from Group A went on to a play-off to decide the world champion.

Qualification game for next year's Group A
 – 	4–6 (1–3)

Belarus kept its place in Group A.

References
bandysidan.nu

2008
2008 in Russian sport
Sports competitions in Moscow
World Championship
2008 in Moscow
World Championship,2008
January 2008 sports events in Europe
February 2008 sports events in Europe